SP-377  is a state highway in the state of São Paulo in Brazil. 
It is fractioned in the following sections:

Monte Aprazível: SP-320 (Tanabi)

References

Highways in São Paulo (state)